Thiofrid (died 1110) was the Benedictine abbot of Echternach Abbey, and writer of works in several different areas. He is one of the few medieval writers to discuss the cult of relics, in his Flores epytaphii sanctorum.

He wrote on Willibrord; in connection with the link between Walcheren, where a church was dedicated to Willibrord, and Echternach. Thiofrid travelled to Frisia to mediate between the inhabitants and a son of Baldwin of Flanders.

References
Hans-Joachim Reischmann (editor and translator) (1989), Willibrord, Apostel der Friesen: Seine Vita nach Alkuin und Thiofrid
Gernot Wieland, The Hermeneutic Style of Thiofrid of Echternach, pp. 27–45, in Sian Echard and Gernot R. Wieland (editors), Anglo-Latin and its Heritage: Essays in Honour of A.G. Rigg on his 64th Birthday (2001)
Michele Ferrari, Gold und Asche. Reliquie und Reliquiare als Medien in Thiofrid von Echternachs ‘Flores epytaphii sanctorum’, pp. 61–74. in Bruno Reudenbach and Gia Toussaint (editors) Reliquiare im Mittelalter (2005)

Notes

External links

 Article

1110 deaths
Abbots of Echternach
Christian hagiographers
Year of birth unknown